Sergio Salvador Peña Zelaya (born 9 May 1987) is a Honduran  footballer who actually play for C.D.S. Vida in the Honduran Liga Nacional.

Career
In July 2014, Peña joined Indy Eleven on loan for the remainder of the 2014 NASL season. Peña re-signed for Indy Eleven in February 2015.

Career statistics

References

1987 births
Living people
Honduran footballers
Honduran expatriate footballers
Liga Nacional de Fútbol Profesional de Honduras players
Honduran Liga Nacional de Ascenso players
C.D. Real Sociedad players
F.C. Motagua players
Indy Eleven players
Expatriate soccer players in the United States
North American Soccer League players
2017 CONCACAF Gold Cup players
People from Colón Department (Honduras)
Association football midfielders
Honduras international footballers